Schoos is a village in the commune of Fischbach, in central Luxembourg.  , the village has a population of 158.

Fischbach, Mersch
Villages in Luxembourg